Tonekabon County is in Mazandaran province, Iran. The capital of the county is the city of Tonekabon. At the 2006 census, the county's population was 193,428 in 55,318 households. The following census in 2011 counted 153,940 people in 48,845 households, by which time Abbasabad District had been separated from the county to form Abbasabad County. At the 2016 census, Tonekabon County's population was 166,132 in 56,636 households.

Administrative divisions

The population history and structural changes of Tonekabon County's administrative divisions over three consecutive censuses are shown in the following table. The latest census shows three districts, seven rural districts, and four cities.

References

 

Counties of Mazandaran Province